The Dublin Waste-to-Energy Facility, also known as the Poolbeg Incinerator, is a waste-to-energy plant serving the Greater Dublin Area, located on the Poolbeg peninsula. The plant is capable of producing up to 60 megawatts of electricity, enough to power 80,000 homes, and provide district heating for up to 50,000 homes in the Dublin area. The facility will process up to 600,000 tonnes of waste per year. Poolbeg accepted its first delivery of waste on the 24th of April 2017.

The proposal to build an incinerator at this location provoked controversy since its inception in 1997 with concerns about traffic and emissions, but construction work finally started in 2014.

Incidents
On June 8, 2017, eleven people were hospitalised after an ‘uncontrolled release’ of lime inside the flue gas treatment area inside the plant. Covanta, the operator of the plant, was ordered to temporarily cease the incineration process at the facility by the Health and Safety Authority.

References

Buildings and structures in Dublin (city)
Energy infrastructure completed in 2017
Waste power stations
Power stations in the Republic of Ireland
2017 establishments in Ireland
21st-century architecture in the Republic of Ireland